Marie Perbost (born 1989) is a French operatic soprano.

Life 
Coming from a family of musicians (her father was a wind instrument teacher and her mother a singer), Perbost studied the cello from the age of 4 to 9, then she joined the Maîtrise de Radio France where she trained with conductors, among others Kurt Masur and Chung Myung-whun. Early one she left Sarcelles to go to school in Paris with modified timetables.

She was accepted at the Conservatoire de Paris where she studied Lied with Alain Buet and Cécile de Boever, and melody with Anne le Bozec.

In 2001, together with 3 singers from the Palais Royal ensemble, she founded the Ensemble 101 to perform Mike Solomon's creations.

She made her soprano debut on stage in 2013, performing the role of Blanche de la Force in the Dialogues of the Carmelites by Francis Poulenc at the Paul Dukas Conservatory in Paris.

Together with pianist Joséphine Ambroselli, they won the Special Prize of the Friends of the Lied at the Enschede International Lieder Competition (Netherlands) in 2013. In 2014, they were laureates of the international competition "Les Saisons de la voix" in Gordes, then Grand Prix at the Nadia and Lili Boulanger International Competition in 2015.

In 2017, she joined the Académie de l'Opéra de Paris as she performs Elisetta in Il matrimonio segreto by Domenico Cimarosa at the Philharmonie de Paris.

She received grants from the Fondation l'Or du Rhin (Fondation de France), the Meyer Foundation and the Kriegelstein Foundation.

Prizes 
 2016 : Révélation artiste lyrique de l'ADAMI
 2020 : Révélation artiste lyrique aux Victoires de la musique classique.

Roles 
 Blanche de la Force –  Dialogues of the Carmelites
 Despina – Così fan tutte, 
 Elisetta – Il matrimonio segreto
 La jeune femme – Reigen
 Pamina – Die Zauberflöte
 Marzelline – Fidelio
 Tullia – Il mondo alla roversa
 Lucine – Le Testament de la tante Caroline
 Marguerite d'Artois – Richard Cœur-de-Lion

Recording 
 Une jeunesse à Paris, label Harmonia Mundi (chansons and operettas of the années folles).
Bach, J.S. - Magnificat BWV 243a

References

External links 
 
 

 

French operatic sopranos
1989 births
Living people
Place of birth missing (living people)
Conservatoire de Paris alumni